Pilot und Flugzeug (meaning Pilot and Aircraft in English) is a German language general aviation magazine published monthly in Germany.

History
Pilot und Flugzeug was founded by Heiko Teegen in 1980. The magazine is published by Pilot und Flugzeug Verlags GmbH on a monthly basis.

The magazine quickly became known for very critical journalism. After the sudden and unexpected death of Heiko Teegen in the summer 2004, Jan Brill took over as editor in chief. Every year the readers are invited to join a fly out, which enables general aviation pilots to take longer trips in groups. These journeys are prepared and supported by the staff of the magazine. 2007 fly out was planned to South America and North America.

References

External links
 Official website

1980 establishments in West Germany
Aviation magazines published in Germany
German-language magazines
Magazines established in 1980
Monthly magazines published in Germany